Diego Masi (Cremona, February 11, 1947) is an Italian entrepreneur and politician.

He overlooked the political scene during the elections of 1994 as a member of the Segni Pact. Before that, he had been city councillor in Milan as part of Christian Democracy. He abandoned this party in 1992, when he followed Mariotto Segni. He was elected for Parliament in the proportional share for the small centre party. He pursued the opposition to the Berlusconi government positions from the centre and subsequently, with the Pact, he was a promoter of the alliance of centre-left The Olive Tree. In 1995, he was a candidate for President of Lombardy Region, supported by the whole centre-left (excluding PRC), but he was defeated by the centre-right candidate, Roberto Formigoni.

At the elections of 1996, he was elected under the coalition of The Olive Tree as a member of the Dini List - Italian Renewal, which had merged with The Pact. He became leader of the Italian Renewal in the Chamber of Deputies, but in December 1996, the Pact departed from Lamberto Dini: Masi, Giuseppe Bicocchi ed Elisa Pozza Tasca stayed loyal to Mariotto Segni.

In the D'alema government he was appointed Vice-Minister of Internal Affairs for Immigrations. However, he distanced himself from the centre and the Government and adhered to the Pole for Freedoms.

He left politics in 2001.

In the communications field, in 1972 he founded Promotions Italia, which became the most important Promotion Marketing Agency in Italy and of which he was president from 1972 to 2009, when the agency became part of WPP group.

From 2005 to 2008 he was Vice-president of J. W. Thompson and president of Rmg-Connect, on behalf of WPP Italian Group.

In 2008 he founded PromoDigital, a company dealing with buzz marketing campaigns for social media. He was chairman of PromoDigital until April 2010, when the company was sold to Teads.

Moreover, he chaired Promoviaggi, the first  agency Italian of incentive travels & conventions in 1974, and founded Go Green Digital in 2011.

Masi had always been present within associations dealing with communications. He was president of Asp and of EFSP (European Federation of Sales Promotion Agencies), then president of AssoCom (2009-2011), which involves the most important Italian communications agencies and finally of Confindustria Intellect.

Talking about solidarity, Masi was president of Action Aid International, one of the most important Italian NGOs, and now he is chairman of ALICE FOR CHILDREN projects by Twins International, which he founded with his wife Daria, taking care of Nairobi's vulnerable children.

In 2016 he founded Agricola Probono, an NGO which collects fresh food from farmers to deliver it to soup kitchens.

Finally, Masi is the author of some books, all published by Lupetti Editore: "Come vendere un partito, un manuale di comunicazione politica", "Dal partito piovra al partito farfalla: la nascita dei partiti leggeri", “L’Italia liberata” and “Il Bipartitismo italiano”.

In 2010 he wrote GO GREEN, new trends of green communication and in 2012 EXPO 2015-La scommessa. He wrote also “Da Predatori a Imprenditori” (2014), which deals with corporate giving and social responsibility.

In 2017 he published “EXPLODING AFRICA”, which is both a book about Africa's future trends and a blog, dealing with Africa's problematic future.

Communication, politics and solidarity. This is Diego Masi profile, married to Daria Oggioni, father of Eleonora and Pietro and grandfather of Angelica.

Sources
Profile on Italian House website

1947 births
Living people
Businesspeople from Cremona
Christian Democracy (Italy) politicians
Segni Pact politicians
Italian Renewal politicians
Deputies of Legislature XII of Italy
Deputies of Legislature XIII of Italy
Politicians from Cremona